Remember Me is the debut studio album by American rapper Sage the Gemini. It was released on March 25, 2014, by HBK Gang Records, EMPIRE Recordings and Republic Records. The album was produced by Gemini himself, The Exclusives, League of Starz, Tha Bizness and members of The Invasion such Jay Ant, Kuya Beats and P-Lo. The album features guest appearances from Iamsu!, Justin Bieber, Kool John, Jay Ant, P-Lo, Eric Bellinger, Berner and August Alsina, among others.

The album was met with generally positive reviews from music critics, who complimented its production and Sage's vocals, but criticized its lyrical content. Remember Me debuted at number 47 on the US Billboard 200, selling 7,200 copies in its first-week. It was certified Gold by the Recording Industry Association of America (RIAA), denoting sales of over 500,000 copies in the United States. The album was supported by five singles: "Red Nose", "Gas Pedal" featuring Iamsu!, "College Drop" featuring Kool John, "Down On Your Luck" featuring August Alsina, and "Don't You".

Reception

Critical reception

Remember Me garnered positive reviews from music critics. At Metacritic, which assigns a normalized rating out of 100 to reviews from critics, the album received an average score of 69, which indicates "generally favorable reviews," based on 10 reviews.

Martin Caballero of USA Today said that "Gas Pedal" only hinted at what his debut album will showcase, which is "buoyed by energetic and richly textured beats, he deftly mixes slick raps with Auto-Tuned vocals on singles like 'Desert of Mirages'." AllMusic's David Jeffries praised the album for containing tracks that exude the same energy that "Gas Pedal" did, calling it a very good party album and praising Sage for being "a great host, juggling familiar and fun with ease." Pitchfork contributor Craig Jenkins praised Sage's production and vocal delivery for bringing a lot charm into the tracks, concluding that: "Remember Me keeps its mood light and its stakes low, and in the process delivers a much needed breezy counterpoint to all the knotty, fatalistic shit coming out of HBK's downstate peers that’s every bit as true to Cali as the gangsters and the thinkers."

Patrick Taylor of RapReviews commended Sage for his production choices that "favor[s] ambient elements over dance elements" and establishing himself as a credible rapper with tracks like "Second Hand Smoke" and "Go Somewhere" that flesh out his character persona but felt he had a limited range of topics and resorted to more conventional hip-hop tropes that feel off with the record's spacious vibes. He concluding that: "It's frustrating that so many of the songs stick to the same clichéd themes because Sage can actually rap. He's got a low-key charm, spitting his rhymes effortlessly […] Remember Me "isn't a perfect album, but it has some great songs and a lot of promise. Sage the Gemini has established himself as an artist worth remembering. HipHopDX writer Ronald Grant gave credit to both Sage and P-Lo for their consistent beat work throughout the track listing, highlighting both "Down On Your Luck" and "Mad at Me" for incorporating R&B sounds that give off a "more melodic, delicate quality", but was critical of the album overall feeling "indistinguishable" with its lyrical subject matter and production lacking "diversity, imagination and risk-taking" alongside similar rap radio content concluding with, "But what Sage The Gemini lacks in lyricism and engaging subject matter, he makes up for in magnetism and harmonic finesse. Remember Mes faults definitely hold it back, but it’s still largely likeable and satisfying when it comes to simply being festive West Coast party Hip Hop."

Jordan Sowunmi from NOW noted how Sage's musicianship wasn't versatile and adopted the same production more suited for "short-burst Vine videos", but said there's an addictiveness to his "spare aesthetic" concluding that: "Overall, the record is buoyed by relentless exuberance and good-natured charm." While finding the album filled with club tracks and lyricism that range from simplistic to odd, Jameel Raeburn of XXL found the production ear-grabbing and danceable, concluding that, "There's no question that Remember Me is best served with the volume turned all the way up." Rolling Stone writer Christopher R. Weingarten was mixed about the album, giving credit to most of the tracks for being attention-grabbing but found it monotonous in its lyrical range. Erin Lowers of Exclaim! also praised Sage's production and voice for being distinct but criticized his lack of deeper lyrical content and songs for not leaving a lasting impact, saying that he "presses the gas pedal too quickly before capturing your attention lyrically or sonically."

Commercial performance
The album debuted at number 47 on the Billboard 200, selling 7,200 copies during its first-week in the United States. It was certified gold by the Recording Industry Association of America in the US on March 26, 2021.

Track listing

Charts and certifications

Weekly charts

Certifications

References

2014 debut albums
Sage the Gemini albums
Republic Records albums
Albums produced by Tha Bizness
Empire Distribution albums